"Liar" is a song by Swedish singer Frans. It was released as a digital download in Sweden on 26 May 2017 through Cardiac Records. The song did not enter the Swedish Singles Chart, but peaked at number four on the Swedish Heatseeker Chart.

Music video
A music video to accompany the release of "Liar" was first released onto YouTube on 26 May 2017 at a total length of three minutes and nine seconds.

Track listing

Charts

Release date

References 

2017 songs
2017 singles
English-language Swedish songs
Frans Jeppsson-Wall songs